TCDD DH6500 was a series of diesel-hydraulic shunter built for the Turkish State Railways. A total of 40 locomotives were built by Krupp-Esslingen after 1960, based closely on DB Class 360. They were equipped with Maybach GT6 engines.

External links
 Trains of Turkey page on DH6500

Krupp locomotives
C locomotives
Turkish State Railways diesel locomotives
Standard gauge locomotives of Turkey
Railway locomotives introduced in 1960